Jariabad (also Romanized as Jārīābād) is a village in Kushk-e Hezar Rural District, Beyza District, Sepidan County, Fars Province, Iran. At the 2006 census, its population was 596, in 131 families.

References 

Populated places in Sepidan County